Shanna Nicole Hudson (born 6 August 1985) is an American-born Haitian former footballer who played as a central midfielder. She has been a member of the Haiti women's national team.

International career
Hudson qualified to play for Haiti through her grandparents. She joined Les Grenadières in 2012 and played the 2014 CONCACAF Women's Championship and the 2014 Central American and Caribbean Games.

References 

1985 births
Living people
Citizens of Haiti through descent
Haitian women's footballers
Women's association football midfielders
Haiti women's international footballers
Competitors at the 2014 Central American and Caribbean Games
Haitian expatriate footballers
Haitian expatriate sportspeople in Japan
Expatriate women's footballers in Japan
People from Venice, Los Angeles
Soccer players from Los Angeles
American women's soccer players
USC Trojans women's soccer players
Cal State Northridge Matadors women's soccer players
Women's Premier Soccer League players
African-American women's soccer players
American sportspeople of Haitian descent
American expatriate women's soccer players
American expatriate sportspeople in Japan
21st-century African-American sportspeople
20th-century African-American people
20th-century African-American women
21st-century African-American women